The Bajada Colorada Formation is a geologic formation of the southern Neuquén Province in the Neuquén Basin of northern Patagonia, Argentina. The formation belongs to the Mendoza Group and is Late Berriasian to Early Valanginian in age. The formation is renowned for preserving fossil remains of Bajadasaurus pronuspinax, a genus of dicraeosaurid dinosaurs named after the formation.

Description 
The Bajada Colorada Formation, first defined by Roll in 1939, pertains to the Mendoza Group. It overlies the Quintuco and Picún Leufú Formations and is overlain by the Agrio Formation. The contact with the Agrio Formation is discordant and the unconformity has been dated to 134 Ma. The formation is laterally equivalent with the Mulichinco Formation. The formation comprises red and greenish-brown, fine to coarse grained conglomerates and thick-bedded sandstones with well-developed bands of light brown siltstones and reddish, pinkish grey and purple-reddish claystones. The formation was deposited in a fluvial environment, and the paleoenviroment resembled a braided river system with well-preserved channels and paleosols.

X-ray diffraction studies of sediments belonging to the Bajada Colorada Formation have revealed the presence of smectite, chlorite, illite and kaolinite.

Fossil content 
The formation has provided fossils of:
 Bajadasaurus pronuspinax
 Leinkupal laticauda
Ninjatitan zapatai
 Abelisauridae indet.
 Abelisauroidea indet.
 Ankylosauria indet.
 Deinonychosauria indet.
 Megalosauridae indet.
 Tetanurae indet.

See also 
 List of dinosaur-bearing rock formations
 Baños del Flaco Formation, contemporaneous formation of the Mendoza Group in Chile
 Chon Aike Formation, contemporaneous formation of central Patagonia

References

Bibliography 
 
 
 
 
 

Geologic formations of Argentina
Lower Cretaceous Series of South America
Cretaceous Argentina
Berriasian Stage
Valanginian Stage
Sandstone formations
Conglomerate formations
Fluvial deposits
Formations
Paleontology in Argentina
Geology of Neuquén Province
Geology of Patagonia